Alverstone railway station, was an intermediate station situated on the edge of Alverstone village      on the Isle of Wight, off the south coast of England.

History

Served by the line from Newport  to Sandown, the station was incorporated by the Isle of Wight (Newport Junction) Railway in 1868 opened in 1875. Absorbed by the Isle of Wight Central Railway, it became part of the Southern Railway during the Grouping of 1923. Passing on to the Southern Region of British Railways on nationalisation in 1948, it was then  closed 81 years after opening by the British Transport Commission.

During a Second World War blackout a train ran through Alverstone and  a railwayman had to escort the passengers back to there from Newchurch.

The site today

The station house is now a private residence. It is a prominent landmark on the walking route and cycle path that runs through Borthwood Copse and into Alverstone Mead.

See also 

 List of closed railway stations in Britain

References 

 
 
 Station on navigable O.S.

External links 
 Subterranea Britannica's page on Alverstone

Disused railway stations on the Isle of Wight
Former Isle of Wight Central Railway stations
Railway stations in Great Britain opened in 1875
Railway stations in Great Britain closed in 1956